"What Is Love" is a song by Haddaway. 

What Is Love may also refer to:

Film and television
 What Is Love? (2013 film), or Nishwartha Bhalobasa, a Bangladeshi film directed by Ananta Jalil
 What Is Love? (2018 film), or Just Only Love, a 2018 Japanese film directed by Rikiya Imaizumi
 What Is Love (TV series), a 2012 Taiwanese romantic comedy series

Literature
 What Is Love? (picture book), a 2021 book written by Mac Barnett and illustrated by Carson Ellis
What Is Love?, a 1928 novel by E. M. Delafield

Music

Albums
 What Is Love? (Andrea Marcovicci album) or the title song, 1992
 What Is Love? (Clean Bandit album), 2018
 What Is Love? (Never Shout Never album) or the title song, 2010
 What Is Love? (EP), by Twice, or the title song (see below), 2018

Songs
 "What Is Love" (En Vogue song), 1993
 "What Is Love?" (Howard Jones song), 1983
 "What Is Love?" (Twice song), 2018
 "What Is Love" (V. Bozeman song), 2015
 "(What Is) Love?", by Jennifer Lopez from Love?, 2011
 "What Is Love?", by Debbie Harry from Necessary Evil, 2007
 "What Is Love", by Exo from Mama, 2012
 "What Is Love?", by Frances from Fifty Shades Darker: Original Motion Picture Soundtrack, 2017
 "What Is Love", by Janelle Monáe from the Rio 2 film soundtrack, 2014
 "What Is Love?", by Lee Hi from 4 Only, 2021
 "What Is Love", by Miriam Makeba from Pata Pata, 1968
 "What Is Love?", by the Playmates, 1959
 "What Is Love", by Take That from The Circus, 2008
 "What Is Love?", written by Irving Berlin

See also
 What's Love (disambiguation)